Fantuzzi is a surname. Notable people with the surname include:

Medardo Fantuzzi (1906–1986), Italian automotive engineer
Antonio Fantuzzi (1510–1550), Italian painter and printmaker

See also
 Ferrari 250 TR 61 Spyder Fantuzzi, a racecar

Italian-language surnames